Sebago may refer to:

Places
In the United States:
 Sebago, Maine, a town in Cumberland County
 Sebago Lake, Maine
 Sebago Lake State Park, on the above lake
 Point Sebago, on the shore of the above lake
 Lake Sebago, New York

Ships
 
 
 
 , launched in 1930 as USS Sebago
 , a harbor tugboat built in 1893 as Sebago

Other
Sebago (company)

See also